The Museum of Dartmoor Life (MDL) is a local museum in Okehampton, Devon, southwest England. It covers life in the Dartmoor area.

The museum opened in 1981.
It is housed on three floors in an early 19th-century mill and there is a waterwheel at the museum. The collections concentrate on the social history of Dartmoor and Okehampton from prehistoric times to the present. The museum is run as an independent charitable trust with a board of trustees.

See also 
 List of museums in Devon

References

External links 
 Museum of Dartmoor Life website

Museums established in 1981
Museums in Devon
Local museums in Devon
Rural history museums in England
Museum of Dartmoor Life
Museum of Dartmoor Life